The Inside-Out Prison Exchange Program (Inside-Out) is an international educational program based in Philadelphia at Temple University.  Inside-Out was established by Lori Pompa in 1997 to bring traditional college students and incarcerated persons together in semester-long courses to explore and learn about issues of crime and justice from behind prison walls.  The program was founded on the hypothesis that incarcerated and non-incarcerated students might mutually benefit from studying together as peers.

The program provides individuals on both sides of the prison walls the unique opportunity to engage in a collaborative, dialogic examination of issues of social significance through the particular lens that is the "prism of prison." Through college classes and community exchanges, the program seeks to deepen the conversation about and transform our approaches to understanding crime, justice, freedom, inequality, and other issues of social concern.  Inside-Out creates a paradigm shift for participants, encouraging transformation and change in individuals and, in so doing, serves as an engine for social change.  Since its inception, students of Inside-Out both inside and outside have time and again claimed that the experience transformed the ways they viewed themselves and the world.

History 

In 1995, Lori Pompa, a professor in the Criminal Justice Department at Temple University, took a group of 15 undergraduate students to the State Correctional Institution at Dallas, PA for a tour of the facility. As part of the tour, Lori and her students met with a panel of men who were incarcerated there, most of whom were serving life sentences. During the panel discussion, they touched on a variety of issues – social, economic, political, racial, psychological, philosophical – as they related to crime and justice. After this engaging, hour-long conversation, it was time to leave, but no one wanted to.

As Lori and her students were about to depart, a panelist named Paul approached Lori, suggesting that the conversation could be expanded over the course of a semester. It could, essentially, be a semester-long course where incarcerated and non-incarcerated students would read the same assignments, write papers, and engage in discussion together each week. Lori told Paul that it was a great idea and promised him she would consider it. However, she knew that the logistics of bringing students on a weekly basis to a facility 120 miles away from Philadelphia were far too challenging.

Yet, in the days after her visit to Dallas, Lori couldn’t stop thinking about Paul’s suggestion. She began to strategize ways to make this program work at a correctional facility closer to her university. Lori approached the Philadelphia Prison System and, in 1997, began teaching a course entitled “The Inside-Out Prison Exchange Program: Exploring Issues of Crime and Justice behind the Walls.” Paul’s idea was put into practice and The Inside-Out Prison Exchange Program was born.

In 2000, other Temple faculty joined Lori in teaching Inside-Out courses and two years later, The Inside-Out Prison Exchange Program expanded to Graterford Prison, a state correctional facility just outside of Philadelphia. By coincidence, Paul was transferred to Graterford and was able to take the first Inside-Out course offered there, which Lori taught. When that course ended, the inside and outside students decided to continue meeting, conversing, and working to raise public awareness about issues of crime, justice, prisons, and mass incarceration. Thus, the Graterford Think Tank was initiated, which began holding public workshops, extending the Inside-Out dialogic learning experience to an audience beyond college students.

Having been awarded a  Soros Justice Senior Fellowship, Lori was able to begin working with inside and outside alumni to develop replication criteria and materials for expanding the program around the country. In 2004, the Graterford Think Tank hosted the inaugural instructor training, launching the first of now 45 Inside-Out Training Institutes, which have equipped over 700 college professors from around the world to teach Inside-Out courses.

An idea conceived in a prison classroom over twenty years ago has now grown into an international movement consisting of more than 100 correctional and higher education partnerships, hundreds of trained instructors, 22 think tanks, and more than 22,000 students who have benefited from these life-changing courses.

Inside-Out Courses
Since 1997, more than 600 Inside-Out courses have been held around the world. Nearly 100 higher education institutions, ranging from small liberal arts colleges to large research universities to local community colleges, sponsor Inside-Out courses. Courses span the humanities and social sciences disciplines including, African-American Studies, Anthropology, Criminal Justice, Drama, Economics, Education, English, Gender Studies, History, Humanities, Law, Nursing, Philosophy, Political Science, Psychology, Public Health, Religion, Social Work, Sociology, Theater, Writing, and Women’s Studies. Over 100 correctional institutions based in urban, rural, and suburban settings, including county jails, state prisons, federal prisons, juvenile facilities, and community correctional facilities at all security levels, host Inside-Out courses. As of 2017, Inside-Out courses have been taught in the United States, Canada, Australia, Denmark, the United Kingdom, and Mexico. The organization updates this information on their Network page.

Inside-Out Instructor Training Institutes 
Since 2004, The Inside-Out Center has trained higher education instructors to teach courses to incarcerated and non-incarcerated persons. The Inside-Out Instructor Training Institute are comprehensive seven-day, 60-hour intensive training programs that covers everything necessary to develop a course in the Inside-Out model: curriculum development, setting parameters, institutional relationships, group dynamics, interactive pedagogical approaches, and more. Three or more of the days provide an opportunity to learn this educational method through observation, hands-on experience, dialogue, and engagement with an Inside-Out Think Tank, a working group of inside and outside alumni based in a jail or prison, who have years of experience in the Inside-Out methodology. Trainings are followed by consultation to assist in on-site program development. As of 2017, 46 training institutes have been held and more than 700 faculty members from around the world have attended.

References

External links
 Tyrone Werts, consultant for the Inside-Out Prison Exchange Program interviewed on Conversations from Penn State

Temple University
United States educational programs
Organizations established in 1997